Ulduz is a subway station in Baku Metro that was opened on 5 May 1970.

See also
List of Baku metro stations

References

Baku Metro stations
Railway stations opened in 1970
1970 establishments in Azerbaijan